Olaf Presents is an animated comedy miniseries of shorts that features Olaf (Josh Gad) retelling the stories of Disney films. The series was inspired by a scene in Frozen II where Olaf recaps Frozen. The series received positive responses, particularly for its humor.

Premise
Olaf performs his own takes on Disney films The Little Mermaid, Moana, The Lion King, Aladdin and Tangled. He reenacts some things incorrectly and exaggerates certain elements. He plays most of the roles by himself, using various things to imitate the characters. At times, Sven, Marshmallow, the Snowgies, Bruni and Gale help him with his performances.

Cast
Josh Gad as Olaf
Frank Welker as Sven
Paul Briggs as Marshmallow

Production, marketing and release
During the production of Frozen II, Disney needed a scene that was both amusing and informative, which would break up the narrative's occasional harsh tone and introduce a moment of sheer absurdity. They used Olaf and created a scene where he recites the events of Frozen. The scene became so popular that Walt Disney Animation Studios revived the concept for Olaf Presents. Gad improvised much of his performance in the series. The trailer featured the opening of The Lion King episode, followed by a series of Olaf Presents segments, each showing a different Disney film. Olaf appears as the Genie from Aladdin before moving on to Moana. Upon the trailer's release, CinemaBlend called it "Frozen meets Drunk History". The series was released on November 12, 2021, coinciding with Disney+ Day, on Disney+, with each episode at approximately 90 seconds.

Episodes
Each of the shorts were directed by Hyrum Virl Osmond.

Reception

Critical response 
Joel Keller of Decider found the series funny and entertaining across its humor, stating the show appears as a refreshing take on some of Disney's intellectual properties, and praised Josh Gad and Frank Welker for their performances. The Wrap writer Drew Taylor called it a "surprising celebration of Disney Animation's history" and "breakthrough in that it is clearly lampooning some aspects of cherished Disney classics, but in a way that is respectful and artistically ambitious". He commended Gad's performance and Olaf's humour, references, and how he could "disrupt" the Frozen world. Overall, he called it perfect, highlighting the animation and comedy. Shane Redding of Screen Rant praised Josh Gad's performance and the humor of the series, writing, "The series is a great use of Olaf's comedic abilities as he takes jabs at and points out the issues with some of Disney's most famous stories. Whether he is highlighting the painfulness of Mufasa's death in his version of The Lion King or singing "Part of Your World" as Ariel in a retelling of The Little Mermaid, Olaf hilariously brings some great Disney stories to life in a way that only he can." Diondra Brown of Common Sense Media rated the series 4 out of 5 stars and praised the humor of the series, while complimenting the depiction of different values, such as curiosity, perseverance, and teamwork, that are portrayed through the characters.

Accolades

Notes

References

External links

2020s American animated television series
2020s American anthology television series
2021 American television series debuts
2021 animated television series debuts
American children's animated anthology television series
American children's animated comedy television series
American computer-animated television series
Disney+ original programming
Disney animated television series
English-language television shows
American animated television spin-offs
Frozen (franchise) shorts